Kindo Didaye is one of the woredas in the Southern Nations, Nationalities, and Peoples' Region of Ethiopia. Part of the Wolayita Zone Kindo Didaye is bordered on the south by the Gamo Gofa Zone, on the west by the Dawro Zone, on the northeast by Kindo Koysha, and on the east by Offa. Kindo Didaye was separated from Offa woreda and Kindo Koysha woreda.

Demographics 
Based on the 2019 population projection conducted by the CSA, this woreda has a total population of 122,061, of whom 47,864 are men and 49,702 women; 1,427 or 1.46% of its population are urban dwellers. The majority of the inhabitants were Protestants, with 70.65% of the population reporting that belief, 19.08% practiced Ethiopian Orthodox Christianity, and 6.07% practiced traditional beliefs.

Notes 

Wolayita
Districts of the Southern Nations, Nationalities, and Peoples' Region